Kulbayevo (Qolbay) is a rural locality (a selo) in Kyzyl-Yarsky Selsoviet, Yermekeyevsky District, Bashkortostan, Russia. The population was 339 as of 2010. There are 5 streets.

Geography 
Kulbayevo is located 22 km northwest of Yermekeyevo (the district's administrative centre) by road. Novozarechensk is the nearest rural locality.

References 

Rural localities in Yermekeyevsky District